Red O'Connor was an American football end who played four seasons in the National Football League with the Chicago Cardinals. He played college football at DePaul University.

References

External links
Just Sports Stats

Year of birth missing
Year of death missing
American football ends
DePaul Blue Demons football players
Chicago Cardinals players